Rivers State House of Assembly is the legislative branch of the Government of Rivers State inaugurated in 1979. It is a unicameral body with 32 members elected into 32 state constituencies. The current Speaker of the State Assembly is Rt. Hon. Ikuinyi O. Ibani.

History

Powers

Qualifications

Composition

Members of the Rivers State House of Assembly
The 8th Rivers State House of Assembly consists of 32 elected representatives from each constituency

Committees

Public Accounts
House Services
Training & Information
Finance
Judiciary
Local Government
Works
Women Affairs
Commerce & Industry
Agriculture
Water resources
Education
Youth Employment & Empowerment
Social Welfare & Rehabilitation/ Pilgrims Board SIEC Budget
Commissions & Agencies
Rules & Business Committee
Public petitions
Ethics & Privileges
UBE
Sustainable Development / Emergency Relief
Transport
Health
Power
Energy & Natural Resources
Chieftaincy & Community Affairs
Land, Housing & Urban Development
Sports
Environment
Bills and Motions
Employment

References

External links
 Rivers State Assembly

 
Politics of Rivers State
Old GRA, Port Harcourt
1979 establishments in Nigeria
1970s establishments in Rivers State
State lower houses in Nigeria